Emil Lundberg (born January 11, 1982) is a Swedish former professional ice hockey Centre. He last played for AIK IF in the Swedish HockeyAllsvenskan (Allsv). 
 
He played for Luleå HF and Brynäs IF in the Swedish Hockey League and HK ŠKP Poprad in the Slovak Extraliga. Lundberg previously trialled with KHL Medveščak Zagreb of the Kontinental Hockey League.

Career statistics

References

External links

1982 births
AIK IF players
Brynäs IF players
HC Lev Poprad players
HK Poprad players
HPK players
EHC Kloten players
Living people
Luleå HF players
Mora IK players
SaiPa players
Swedish ice hockey centres
People from Luleå
Sportspeople from Norrbotten County
Swedish expatriate sportspeople in Slovakia
Swedish expatriate sportspeople in Switzerland
Swedish expatriate ice hockey players in Finland
Expatriate ice hockey players in Slovakia
Expatriate ice hockey players in Switzerland